Cinema City Enterprises Ltd (In Chinese 新藝城企業有限公司) also known as Cinema Capital Entertainment and Cinema City Entertainment, formerly Cinema City and Films Co. and Cinema City Company Limited was a company that specialized in Hong Kong Cinema. The company had a small catalogue of only 88 movies. Their library covers genres including drama, comedy, horror.

The company was established in 1979 by actors Raymond Wong, Karl Maka and Dean Shek. The company was successful throughout the 1980s, but went into financial trouble around the early 1990s. Their last movie was "Blue Lightning" in 1991, produced shortly before the company shut down. They were known for producing films such as A Better Tomorrow.

History
In 1970, Warriors Film Company was founded by comedians Raymond Wong, Karl Maka, and Dean Shek.  They then released their first two films, which were called Crazy Partner in 1979, and Crazy Crooks in 1980.In 1980, Warriors Film Company was renamed to Cinema City. Tsui Hark and Raymond Chow made movies like All The Wrong Clues For The Right Solution. In the 1980s, Cinema City was invested into by Golden Princess Amusement Co., Ltd. Because of this, they teamed up to eventually become the third biggest force in Hong Kong Cinema, competing with Shaw Brothers and Golden Harvest for nearly a decade.

However, as Cinema City's productions slowed down, Golden Princess formed their own production company. The studio ran into some financial troubles around the early '90s, and attempts to fully revive it were unsuccessful, leaving some spin-off companies like Cinema City Enterprises/Cinema Capital Entertainment and Cinema City Entertainment. Cinema City went defunct because of this in 1991. Only Raymond Wong remained to continue making movies as Mandarin Films Limited since 1992 (later Pegasus Motion Pictures and Mandarin Motion Pictures).

List of films and production codes

1979
Crazy Partner directed by Karl Maka - WF01 (first movie)

1980
Crazy Crooks directed by Raymond Wong - WF02

1981
All The Wrong Clues For The Right Solution directed by Tsui Hark - TS-001
Beware of Pickpockets directed by Wu Ma - TS-002
Chasing Girls directed by Karl Maka - TS-003
Laughing Times directed by John Woo - TS-004

1982
Aces Go Places directed by Eric Tsang - TS-005
Can't Stop The War directed by Yue Ham Ping - TS-006
He Lives By Night directed by Leong Po Chih - TS-007
It Takes Two directed by Karl Maka - TS-008

1983
Aces Go Places II directed by Eric Tsang - TS-009
All The Wrong Spies directed by Teddy Robin Kwan - TS-010
Esprit d'amour directed by Ringo Lam - TS-011
The Perfect Wife?! directed by Dean Shek Tien  - TS-012
Send In The Clowns directed by Lam Ching Gaai  - TS-013
Papa, Can You Hear Me Sing directed by Yu Kanping  - TS-014

1984
Aces Go Places III directed by Tsui Hark and Corey Yuen - TS-015
Banana Cop directed by Leong Po Chih - TS-015
Happy Ghost directed by Clifton Ko - TS-016
Heaven Can Help directed by David Chiang Da Wei - TS-017
The Occupant directed by Ronny Yu Yan Tai - TS-018
Run Tiger Run directed by John Woo - TS-019
A Family Affair directed by Dean Shek Tin - TS-020

1985
For Your Heart Only directed by Raymond Fung Sai Hung - TS-021
Love, Lone Flower directed by Lin Ching-Chieh - TS-022
Happy Ghost II directed by Clifton Ko Chi Sum - TS-021
The Isle Of Fantasy directed by Michael Mak Tong Kit - TS-022
Kung Hei Fat Choy directed by Dean Shek Tien - TS-023
Mismatched Couples directed by Yuen Woo Ping - TS-024
Mummy Dearest directed by Ronny Yu Yan Tai - TS-025
The Time You Need A Friend directed by John Woo - TS-026
Working Class directed by Tsui Hark - TS-027
Cupid One directed by Ringo Lam - TS-028
Why Me? directed by Kent Cheng - TS-029

1986
Aces Go Places IV directed by Ringo Lam - TS-030
A Better Tomorrow directed by John Woo - TS-031
A Book Of Heroes directed by Kevin Chu - TS-032
Happy Ghost III directed by Johnnie To - TS-033
The Thirty Million Dollar Rush directed by Karl Maka - TS-034
True Colours directed by Kirk Wong Chi Keung - TS-035
Peking Opera Blues directed by Tsui Hark - TS-036

1987
A Better Tomorrow II directed by John Woo - TS-037
City On Fire directed by Ringo Lam - TS-038
Evil Cat directed by Dennis Yu Wan Kwong - TS-039
Lady in Black directed by Sun Chung - TS-040
The Legend Of Wisely directed by Teddy Robin Kwan
Prison On Fire directed by Ringo Lam - TS-041
Seven Years Itch directed by Johnnie To - TS-042
Trouble Couples directed by Eric Tsang - TS-043

1988
The Big Heat directed by Andrew Kam Yeung Wah, Johnnie To, Tsui Hark - TS-044
City War directed by Sun Chung - TS-045
The Eighth Happiness directed by Johnnie To - TS-046
Fatal Love directed by Leong Po Chih - TS-047
Fractured Follies directed by Wong Chung - TS-048
Gunmen directed by Kirk Wong Chi Keung - TS-049
School on Fire directed by Ringo Lam - TS-050
Tiger on the Beat directed by Lau Kar Leung - TS-051
All About Ah Long directed by Johnnie To - TS-052

1989
Aces Go Places V directed by Lau Kar Leung - TS-053
They Came to Rob Hong Kong directed by Clarence Ford - TS-054
Triads - The Inside Story directed by Taylor Wong Tai Loy - TS-055
Web Of Deception directed by David Chung Chi Man - TS-056

1990
Chicken a la Queen directed by Lee Hon To - TS-057
The Fun, the Luck & the Tycoon directed by Johnnie To - TS-058
A Killer's Blues directed by Raymond Lee Wai Man - TS-059
Skinny Tiger, Fatty Dragon directed by Lau Kar Wing - TS-060
Tiger On The Beat 2 directed by Lau Kar Leung TS-061
Undeclared War directed by Ringo Lam - TS-062

1991
The Raid directed by Tony Ching Siu Tung and Tsui Hark - TS-063
Prison On Fire II directed by Ringo Lam - TS-064
Royal Scoundrel directed by Jonathan Chik Gei Yee and Johnnie To - TS-065
Blue Lightning directed by Raymond Lee Wai Man - TS-066 (last movie)

Production code types
 WF0X: "Warriors Film Company" production code
 TS-XXX: New production code

References

External links
Creating Cinema City at Hong Kong CineMagic.com

Film production companies of Hong Kong
Mass media companies of Hong Kong

zh:新藝城